The Aero-Flight Streak was an American two-seat light aircraft built in 1946 by Aero-Flight Aircraft Corporation at Buffalo, New York. Advanced for its time, it was of all-metal construction with tricycle undercarriage, and accommodated the pilot and passenger in tandem beneath a sliding, bubble canopy.

Initially flown powered by a Continental C85, successively more powerful engines were fitted in an attempt to arouse interest in the marketplace. Due to the saturation of the light aircraft market in the years immediately following World War II, no production ensued and the project was dead by 1953.

Variants
AFA-1 Streak-85Powered by  Continental C85-12J.
AFA-2 Streak-125Powered by  Continental C125.
AFA-3 Streak-165Powered by Franklin 6A4
AFA-4 Streak-225Powered by a 225 hp Continental engine

Specifications (AFA-3)

References

Bibliography

 Taylor, J. H. (ed) (1989) Jane's Encyclopedia of Aviation. Studio Editions: London. p. 28
 Aerofiles

External links

 
 

Streak
Single-engined tractor aircraft
1940s United States civil utility aircraft
Low-wing aircraft
Aircraft first flown in 1946